This is a list of settlements located on the coastline of Lake Skadar, also known as Lake Scutari, Lake Shkodër and Lake Shkodra. Lake Skadar is the largest lake in the Balkan peninsula. It is located between the countries of Montenegro and Albania. Settlements are automatically listed west to east. The table can be reorganised based on country, municipality name, population, and the language(s) spoken in the settlement. Major settlements (population of 1000 or greater) are highlighted in bold.

Lake Skadar Settlements